UNCC may refer to:

The University of North Carolina at Charlotte, a university in Charlotte, North Carolina, United States
 A now-obsolete reference to the Charlotte 49ers, the above school's athletic program
The United Nations Compensation Commission, a subsidiary organ of the UN Security Council, set up in the aftermath of the 1990 Iraqi invasion of Kuwait 
The United Nations Conciliation Commission, established by the UN General Assembly to help resolve the 1948 Arab-Israeli War.
The Uganda National Cultural Centre in Kampala
The United Nations Conference Centre (Addis Ababa) in Addis Ababa, Ethiopia, administered by UNECA
The United Nations Conference Centre (Bangkok) in Bangkok, Thailand, headquarters of ESCAP 
Novosibirsk Severny Airport in Novosibirsk, Russia (ICAO code UNCC)